Don't Let Love Slip Away is the third studio album by American singer Freddie Jackson. It was released by Capitol Records on July 29, 1988. The album reached number one on the US Top R&B/Hip-Hop Albums and peaked at number 48 on the Billboard 200. It was eventually certified gold by the RIAA in April 1989. Its singles, "Nice 'N' Slow" and "Hey Lover", reached number one on the R&B chart.

Track listing

Personnel and credits 
Musicians

 Freddie Jackson – lead vocals, backing vocals (1, 3, 4, 5)
 Barry J. Eastmond – keyboards (1, 3, 4, 5), programming (1), drum programming (1, 3, 4), rhythm arrangements (1, 3, 4, 5), string arrangements (1, 3, 5), synthesizers (5)
 Eric Rehl – keyboards (1), programming (1), synthesizers (5)
 Paul Laurence – instruments (2, 8), arrangements (2, 8), backing vocals (8)
 Darryl Shepherd – programming (2, 8)
 Douglas Booth – keyboards (6, 9, 10), drum programming (6, 9, 10), backing vocals (6, 9, 10)
 Amir Bayyan – keyboards (7), guitar (7), drum programming (7)
 Mike Campbell – guitar (1, 3, 4)
 Ira Siegel – guitar (5)
 Skip McDonald – guitar (6, 9, 10)
 Wayne Brathwaite – bass (3)
 Doug Wimbish – bass (6, 9, 10)
 Terry Silverlight – drums (5)
 Bashiri Johnson – percussion (3, 5)
 Joe Deihl – bells (10)
 Najee – alto saxophone (1), soprano saxophone (3)
 Steve Greenfield – alto saxophone (7)
 Curtis King – backing vocals (1, 3, 4, 5)
 Yolanda Lee – backing vocals (1-5, 8)
 Cindy Mizelle – backing vocals (1-5, 8)
 Audrey Wheeler – backing vocals (2, 3, 8)
 Gene McFadden – backing vocals (6, 9, 10), arrangements (6, 9, 10)
 Cindy Robinson – backing vocals (6, 9, 10)
 Kevin Owens – backing vocals (7)

Production

 Producers – Barry J. Eastmond (Tracks 1, 3, 4 & 5); Paul Laurence (Tracks 2 & 8); Gene McFadden  (Tracks 6, 9 & 10); Amir Bayyan (Track 7).
 Executive Producers – Wayne Edwards, Beau Higgins and Freddie Jackson.
 Assistant Producers – Darryl Shepherd (Tracks 2 & 8); Linda Vitali (Tracks 6, 9 & 10 ).
 Engineers – Mike Allaire (Tracks 1, 3, 4 & 5); Ron Banks (Tracks 2 & 8); Kurt Upper (Tracks 6, 7, 9 & 10); Mike Bova and Peter Dlugokenchy (Track 7).
 Assistant Engineers – Paul Logus (Tracks 2, 6, 8, 9 & 10); Charles Alexander (Track 8).
 Recorded at East Bay Studios (Tarrytown, NY); Minot Sound (White Plains, NY); Electric Lady Studios, Soundtrack Studios and Sound Ideas Studios (New York, NY); The Music Palace (West Hempstead, NY).
 Mixing – Steve Goldman (Tracks 1, 3, 4 & 5); Ron Banks (Tracks 2 & 8); Mallory Earl (Tracks 6, 9 & 10).
 Mixed at Unique Recording Studios and Skyline Studios (New York, NY).
 Mastered by Jack Skinner at Sterling Sound (New York, NY).
 Production Coordinator – Zack Vaz
 Production Administrator – Anne Thomas
 Art Direction – Tommy Steele
 Design – DNZ, The Design group
 Photography – Bret Lopez
 Management – Hush Productions, Inc.

Charts

Weekly charts

Year-end charts

Certifications

References

External links
 Don't Let Love Slip Away at Discogs

1988 albums
Freddie Jackson albums
Capitol Records albums